The 1938 NFL season was the 19th regular season of the National Football League. The season ended when the New York Giants defeated the Green Bay Packers in the NFL Championship Game.

Draft
The 1938 NFL Draft was held on December 12, 1937 at Chicago's Hotel Sherman. With the first pick, the Cleveland Rams selected fullback Corbett Davis from Indiana University Bloomington.

Major rule changes
A new 15-yard penalty for roughing the passer is enacted.
If a kickoff goes out of bounds, the receiving team may opt to take possession of the ball at their own 45-yard line.
The penalty for a second forward pass during a play is changed from 5 yards and a loss of down to just 5 yards.

Division races
In Week Seven, the Bears lost at home to the Rams, 23–21, while the Packers beat the Pirates (the future Steelers) 20–0, giving Green Bay the lead for the first time.  The Packers won their next three games to clinch the Western Division.

In the Eastern Division, the Redskins led until Week Ten, when they fell to the Bears, 31–7; the Giants' 28–0 win over the Rams gave New York the division lead on November 13.  The division title still came down to the last day of the regular season, December 4, when 57,461 turned out at the Polo Grounds in New York to watch the 7–2–1 Giants host the 6–2–2 Redskins.  A Washington win would have made them 7–2–2 and New York 7–3–1, with the Skins as division champs.  New York needed only to win or tie, and did the former, five touchdowns en route to a 36–0 victory.

Four neutral-site games were held: two at Civic Stadium in Buffalo, New York, one in Erie, Pennsylvania, and one in Charleston, West Virginia. The Buffalo games marked the league's first return to Buffalo since the folding of the Bisons in 1929.

Final standings

NFL Championship Game

The New York Giants defeated the Green Bay Packers, 23–17, at the Polo Grounds in New York City on December 11, 1938 to win the Championship.

All-Star game

After being crowned champion the Giants faced a team of "Pro All-Stars", an all-star team consisting mostly of NFL players but also including three players from the Los Angeles Bulldogs, in an exhibition game at Wrigley Field in Los Angeles on January 15, 1939. The game, which the Giants won 13–10, was the first of five annual NFL all-star games held under the format (but the only one to include non-NFL players) prior to the creation of the Pro Bowl in 1951.

League leaders

Awards

Coaching changes
Cleveland Rams: Hugo Bezdek was released after three games in 1938. Art Lewis served as interim for the last eight.

Stadium changes
 The Cleveland Rams moved to Shaw Stadium. They spent the previous 1937 season splitting their home games between Cleveland Municipal Stadium and League Park.
 The Detroit Lions started to split their home games between University of Detroit Stadium and Briggs Stadium.

References

Sources
 NFL Record and Fact Book
 NFL History 1931–1940  (Last accessed December 4, 2005)
 Total Football: The Official Encyclopedia of the National Football League

National Football League seasons